Miss Equatorial Guinea (traditionally known as Miss Guinea Ecuatorial) is an annual national beauty pageant in Equatorial Guinea. The reigning queen is Alba Isabel Obama from Mbini.

History
Began in 2012 the Miss Equatorial Guinea is an annual pageant who responsible for selecting Equatorial Guinea's representative to the Miss World pageant. The pageant is held by Agencia Mouge. In recent year the organization took over the licenses of Miss Universe and Miss International for the first time.

Titleholders
Started in 2019 since the Mogue official franchisor of Miss Universe, Miss World and Miss International; three winners divided into three categories such as Miss Equatorial Guinea (ultimate winner goes to Miss Universe), Miss Mundo Equatorial Guinea and Miss Internacional Equatorial Guinea.

Titleholders under Miss Guinea Equatorial org.

Miss Universo Guinea Ecuatorial

Miss Mundo Guinea Ecuatorial

Miss Internacional Guinea Ecuatorial

References

External links
agenciamogue.com

Equatorial Guinea
Equatorial Guinea
Equatorial Guinea
Recurring events established in 2012
Beauty pageants in Equatorial Guinea
Equatoguinean awards
2012 establishments in Equatorial Guinea